If the parties to a legal case anticipate that it will not take up a significant amount of time, they may apply for the court to designate it as a short cause.  Cases on the "short cause" calendar will get priority since they will not tie up a courtroom for a long time.

The time permitted for a short cause varies from one court to another, but usually will not exceed one day.  Other traits include, e.g., usually no jury is used.

If a "short cause" lasts beyond its designated time limit, the judge may declare a mistrial and reset the case to be held later as a "long cause."

California
California's Rules of Court provide:

See also
Law and motion calendar
Long cause

References

Legal terminology